Thomas Patrick Lahey (October 21, 1919 – October 18, 2009) was an American football end.

Lahey was born in Dunbridge, Ohio, and attended Bowling Green High School in Bowling Green, Ohio. He played college football for John Carroll.  He also served in the Marine Corps during World War II and played on the 1945 El Toro Flying Marines football team.

He played professional football in the All-America Football Conference for the Chicago Rockets from 1946 to 1947. He appeared in 26 games, 14 as a starter, and caught 30 passes for 351 yards.

Lahey died in Northbrook, Illinois, in 2009.

References

1919 births
2009 deaths
People from Wood County, Ohio
American football ends
Chicago Rockets players
John Carroll Blue Streaks football players
Players of American football from Ohio